Don or Donald Palmer may refer to:

 Don Palmer (footballer) (born 1938), Australian rules footballer
 Don Palmer (rower) (1927–1980), Australian rower
 Donald Palmer, United States emeritus professor of philosophy